Lars Olof "Olle" Gustaf Ljungström (12 August 1961 – 4 May 2016) was a Swedish singer, songwriter, and musician. Ljungström grew up in Vaxholm. He was vocalist and guitarist in the group Reeperbahn from  1979 to 1984; since the early 1990s he performed solo.

Reeperbahn
Ljungström began his musical career as vocalist and guitarist in the Swedish rock group Reeperbahn. The group, which initially also consisted of Dan Sundquist (bass), Eddie Sjöberg (guitar) and Peter Korhonen (drums), made their self-titled debut album in 1979. On their first LP, Reeperbahn used both Swedish and English lyrics, but later on settled for only Swedish songs. The group made three more full-length albums, Venuspassagen (1981), Peep-Show (1983) and Intriger (1983) before splitting up in 1984.

Heinz and Young
After Reeperbahn, Ljungström briefly formed a duo named Heinz & Young with Heinz Liljedahl (from the band Ratata). The duo released only one album entitled Buzzbuzzboys... in 1984, with only English lyrics. The album included compositions by both artists with the double A-side single "No Matter at All" / "California dreamin'" released as a 7" single.

Liljedahl has also collaborated with Ljungström on the latter's first six solo albums 1993-2002.

Solo career
In 1993, Ljungström made his debut as a solo performer with a self-titled album. He was first signed to MNW and later on to Metronome. As a solo performer, Ljungström sang in Swedish.

Ljungström has also appeared on songs by other artists from time to time; he contributed to the group Wilmer X's record Hallå Världen, with the song "Jag är bara lycklig när jag dricker" (translates to "I'm only happy when I'm drinking").

He was found dead in his home in Alingsås on 4 May 2016.

Discography

Albums
Solo albums

Compilation albums

with Reeperbahn
1979: Reeperbahn
1980: No / Time / Outside Wall / Flowers (EP / maxi-single)
1981: Venuspassagen
1982: Samlade singlar (compilation album)
1983: Peep-Show
1983: Intriger
1993: 79-83 (compilation album)
with Stry Terrarie
2006: R U Sockudåpad?

EPs
1997: "Nåt för dom som väntar"

Bibliography
 Jag är både listig och stark (Norstedts, 2011)

References 

1961 births
2016 deaths
Swedish male musicians
Swedish-language singers